Miloš Šejn (born 10 August 1947 in Jablonec nad Nisou) is a Czech artist (transliteration of the family name: Shein, Schein, Sein, Sejn).

Academy
Šejn graduated from the Faculty of Philosophy, Charles University in Prague in 1975 (visual art - doc. Zdeněk Sýkora; art history and aesthetics - professor Petr Wittlich, doc. Miloš Jůzl). In 1976 he received his Doctor of Philosophy title; in 1991 he was appointed professor of painting. In the years 1990-2011 he directed the Intermedia Department at the Academy of Fine Arts, Prague. He was a visiting professor at the Academies in Aix-en-Provence, Carrara, Ljubljana, Reykjavík, Stuttgart, The Hague and Vienna.

Art
Šejn works in the fields of visual art, performance and study of visual perception, and conducts workshops, such as Bohemiae Rosa. His artistic concept was formed in his youth when he undertook many trips into the wilderness as a reflection of an inner need to get closer to the secret of nature and observe the miracles that happen in it. From the beginning of the 1960s he took pictures, drew, collected and described his observations of nature during these wanderings. Currently he teaches privately mixed media and the relationship of nature and art as intrinsic needs of the mind, and focuses on immediate creative possibilities, based upon relations between historical humanized landscapes and intact nature. He consciously works in the areas of expressive language among text, visual stroke, body movement, voice, and expansion into space.

External links

 homepage
 Miloš Šejn in ARTFACTS
 Videos
 Publications / Texts
 Bohemiae Rosa
 Lara Mallien: Im Moment des Nicht-Sterbens weiß ich, dass ich ein Mensch bleibe. (In the moment of not-dying I know that I will stay a human being.) German-language biographical essay on Miloš Šejn. In: Oya magazine 53/2019.

Czech artists
1947 births
Living people
Charles University alumni